Jim or James Victor may refer to:

James Conway Victor (1792–1864), British Army major general
James Victor (actor) (1939–2016), Dominican-born American actor
Jim Victor (1946–2018), American racecar driver (List of driver deaths in motorsport)
James Victor (cycling) (born 1962), Australian cycling coach

See also
Jamie Victory (born 1975), English footballer from 1994 to 2008